The following is a timeline of the history of the city of Tehran, Iran.

Prior to 20th century

 1553 – City wall built.
 1576 - Golestan Palace completed.
 1660 - Grand Bazaar reported to be open.
 1723 – Afghans (Pashtuns) occupy the city.
 1751 – Takht-e Marmar built.
 1759 – Khalvat Karim Khani built (approximate date).
 1785 – Town besieged by forces of Agha Mohammad.
 1786 – Mohammad Khan Qajar moves Iran's capital from Sari to Tehran.
 1790 – Palace built (later became Qasr Prison).
 1796 – Population: less than 15,000.
 1810-25 - Construction of Shah Mosque. 
 1829 – 11 February: Russian embassy attacked; Alexander Griboyedov and others killed.
 1834 – Ali Mirza Zill-i Sultan in power.
 1835 – Mohammad Shah Qajar in power.
 1837 – Kaghaz-e Akhbar (newspaper) begins publication.
 1851 – Dar ul-Funun (school) founded.
 1861 – 1 March: Unrest.
 1865 – Golestan Palace rebuilt.
 1867 – Shams-ol-Emareh built.
 1869
 City expanded by Naser al-Din Shah.
 Population: 155,000.
 1872 – Jolfa-Tabriz-Tehran telegraph begins operating (approximate date).
 1873
 City wall rebuilt.
 Museum founded by Naser al-Din Shah.
 1881 – Baharistan Palace built.
 1883 – Abyaze Palace built.
 1888 – Teheran-Abd-al-Azim Railway begins operating. 
 1889 – Imperial Bank of Persia headquartered in Tehran.
 1896
 1 May: Assassination of Naser al-Din Shah Qajar; Mozaffar ad-Din Shah Qajar in power.
 Tarbiyat newspaper begins publication.
 1899 – Tehran School of Political Sciences established.

20th century

1900s–1940s
 1906
 "Bast of the constitutionalists at the British legation" occurs.
 Baharestan parliament building inaugurated. 
 1907
 31 August: Assassination of Mirza Ali Asghar Khan Amin al-Soltan.
 German School established.
 1908
  becomes mayor.
 Bombardment of Iranian parliament by Russian forces.
 1909
 13–15 July: City taken by nationalist forces of Ali-Qoli Khan Bakhtiari.
 18 July: Ahmad Shah Qajar in power.
 1910 – Mirza Abbaskhan Mohandes Bashi Hodud becomes mayor.
 1911 – Population: approximately 280,000.
 1914 – Ebrahim-Khan Yomn-Olsaltaneh Monaghah becomes mayor.
 1918
 School of Law established.
 Conservatory of Music founded.
 1919 – Armaḡān literary journal begins publication.(fa)
 1920 – Iran Club (football) founded.
 1921
 21 February: Persian Cossack forces occupy city during the 1921 Persian coup d'état.
 Zia'eddin Tabatabaee becomes mayor.
 1923 – Karim Buzarjomehri becomes mayor.
 1925 / 1304 SH – 31 March: Solar Hijri calendar legally adopted in Iran.
 1926 – Ettela'at newspaper begins publication.
 1929 – Governmental Technical Institute founded.
 1931 – University of Tehran Botanical Garden founded.
 1932 – The Second Eastern Women's Congress takes place in Tehran in Iran.
 1934
 University of Tehran inaugurated.
 Gholi Hooshmand becomes mayor.
 1937
 National Library of Iran inaugurated.
 Marble Palace completed.
 1938
 Trans-Iranian Railway (Bandar Shah-Tehran-Bandar Shahpur) in operation.
 Ghasem Soor-Esrafil becomes mayor.
 1939
 Rangsazi Iran was founded
 1940
 Ali Asghar Foruzan becomes mayor.
 Population: 400,000.
 1942
 Seyed Mehdi Emadolsaltaneh becomes mayor.
 Bread riot.
 1943
 Tehran Conference held.
 1944 – Gholam-Hossein Ebtehaj becomes mayor.
 1945
 Fada'iyan-e Islam (political group) founded.
  becomes mayor, succeeded by Mehdi Mashayekhi.
 1947
 Institut français d'iranologie de Téhéran founded.
 1949
 Apadana art gallery opens.
  becomes mayor.

1950s–1960s
 1950 – Mehdi Namdar becomes mayor.
 1951
 Embassy of the United States, Tehran built.
 1952 –  becomes mayor.
 1953
 August – Coup d'état.
 Mohsen Nasr becomes mayor.
 City Park created.
 1955
  becomes mayor.
 Alavi Institute founded.
 1956
 Allameh Tabatabai University established.
 Population: 1,512,032.
 Mahmood Davaloo becomes mayor.
 1957 –  becomes mayor.
 1958
 Tehran Polytechnic and Tehran Zoo established.
 Tehran Biennial art exhibit begins.
 Mousa Maham becomes mayor.
 Ekbatan Town (Persian: شهرک اکباتان - Shahrak e Ekbātān).
 1959
 Nasser Zolfaghari becomes mayor.
 World Wrestling Championships held.
 1960
 Fathollah Forood becomes mayor.
 Central Bank of the Islamic Republic of Iran established.
 1961
 Mohsen Nasr becomes mayor.
 German Speaking Evangelical Church, Tehran built.
 1962
 Ahmad Nafisi becomes mayor.
 Tehran War Cemetery built.
 1963
 Persepolis Athletic and Cultural Club established.
 Population: 2,317,116 (estimate).
 1964
 Higher Educational Institute For Girls founded.
 International Regional Cooperation for Development headquartered in Tehran.
 1965
  becomes mayor.
 Aryamehr Technical University and Hosseiniyeh Ershad (institute) founded.
 1966
 Rey and Tajrish become part of Tehran.
 Malek National Library and Museum opens.
 Population: 2,719,730.
 1968
 April–May: International Conference on Human Rights held in city.
 Tehran derby (football contest) begins.
 National Botanical Garden of Iran established.
 Niavaran Palace built.
 Javad Shahrestani becomes mayor.
 1969 – Gholamreza Nikpey becomes mayor.

1970s–1990s
 1971
 February: International OPEC meeting held in city; "Tehran Agreement" signed.
 Azadi Tower and Azadi Stadium built.
 1972
 Teatr-e Shahr (theatre) and National Arts Museum inaugurated.
 Evin Prison built.
 Sister city relationship established with Los Angeles, USA.
 1973
 Apadana Stadium opens in Ekbatan.
 Population: 4,002,000 (approximate).
 1974 – September: 7th Asian Games (sport contest) held in city.
 1976
 16 September: Alleged UFO sighting.
 Carpet Museum of Iran founded.
 1977 – Reza Abbasi Museum, Jamshidieh Stone Garden, and Tehran Museum of Contemporary Art open.
 1978
 8 September: Protesters shot in Zaleh Square.
 Javad Shahrestan becomes mayor again.
 1979
 1 February: Ayatollah Khomeini returns.
 30–31 March: National Iranian Islamic Republic referendum held.
 4 November: Students seize United States embassy and its occupants; Iran hostage crisis begins.
 Mohammad Tavasoli becomes mayor.
 Tehran Times newspaper begins publication.
 1980
 Reza Zavarehi becomes mayor, succeeded by Seyed amal ol-din Neek Ravesh.
 Iranian legislative election, 1980 (Tehran, Rey, Shemiranat and Eslamshahr) held.
 German Embassy School Tehran inaugurated.
 1981
 28 June: Hafte Tir bombing.
 Apadana Residential Complex built.
 Gholam-Hossein Deljoo becomes mayor.
 1982
  becomes mayor.
 Population: 5,734,000 (estimate).
 1983
 Center for the Great Islamic Encyclopedia and Institut Français de Recherche en Iran established.
 Hossein Bonakdar becomes mayor, succeeded by Mohammad-Nabi Habibi.
 Musala of Tehran built.
 1985 – Abrar newspaper begins publication.
 1986 – Concept of "Greater Tehran" in use.
 1987 – Morteza Tabatabaei becomes mayor.
 1988
 Tehran International Book Fair begins.
 Gholamhossein Karbaschi becomes mayor.
 1989
 11 June: Funeral of Ayatollah Khomeini.
 Mausoleum of Khomeini built.
 Tehran International Puppet Theatre Festival begins.
 1991 – Bahman Cultural Center opens.
 1992
 February: International Economic Cooperation Organisation summit held in Tehran.
 Hamshahri newspaper begins publication.
 Trolleybus begins operating.
 Iranian Crown Jewels on display at the Central Bank.
 1996 – Population: 6,758,845.
 1997 – November: 1st West Asian Games (sport contest) held in city.
 1999
 February: Local election held
 July: Student protest.
 Tehran Metro begins operating.
 City Council of Tehran begins.
 Morteza Alviri becomes mayor.

21st century

2000s

 2002
 Mohammad-Hassan Malekmadani elected mayor, succeeded by acting mayor Mohmmad-Hossein Moghimi.
 Shahid Dastgerdi Stadium and Shahid Derakhshan Stadium built.
 Film Museum of Iran in Bagh-e Ferdows and Iranian National Museum of Medical Sciences History open.
 2003
 February: Local election held.
 June: Protest against clerics.
 Al Alam television begins broadcasting.
  Mahmoud Ahmadinejad becomes mayor.
 2004
 February: Asian Indoor Athletics Championships held in city.
 Tehran Imam Khomeini International Airport opens.
 2005
 6 December: Iranian Air Force C-130 crash occurs.
 Tehran International Tower and Bank Markazi Tower built.
 Ali Saeedlou becomes mayor, succeeded by Mohammad Bagher Ghalibaf.
 2006
 Population: 7.5 million (approximate).
  magazine headquartered in Tehran.
 2007
 Milad Tower built.
 Tehran Peace Museum opens.
 International Festival of Peace Poetry begins.
 2008
 Tehran Bus Rapid Transit begins operating.
 Safir Office Machines Museum and Mellat Cinema Complex open.
 2009 – Election protests.

2010s
 2010
 January: Assassination of scientist Masoud Alimohammadi in Gheytarieh.
 April: International Conference on Disarmament and Non-Proliferation held in city.
 May: International 14th G-15 summit held in city.
 Election protests.
 Disappeared statues.
 2011
 Protests.
 November: British Embassy attacked.
 Population: 8,154,051.
 2012 – August: International 16th Summit of the Non-Aligned Movement held in city.
 2013 – Local election.
 2014
 June: Sandstorm.
 City becomes part of newly formed national administrative Region 1.
 2020s
 2022
 Mahsa Amini protests

See also
 Tehran history
 List of mayors of Tehran
 List of members of City Council of Tehran
 List of religious centers in Tehran
 List of museums in Tehran
 Timeline of the Iranian Revolution
 Timelines of other cities in Iran: Bandar Abbas, Hamadan, Isfahan, Kerman, Mashhad, Qom, Shiraz, Tabriz, Yazd

References

This article incorporates information from the Persian Wikipedia, French Wikipedia, and German Wikipedia.

Bibliography

in English
 . (includes brief description of Tehran)
 
 
 
 
 
 
 
 
 
 
 
 
 
 Mansoureh Ettehadieh Nezam-Mafi. "Patterns in Urban Development: the Growth of Tehran (1852–1903)", in Edmund Bosworth and Carole Hillenbrand, eds., Qajar Iran: Political, Social and Cultural Change 1800–1925 (Costa Mesa: Mazda, 1992), pp. 199–212.
 Ali Madanipour. Tehran: The Making of a Metropolis (New York: John Wiley, 1998).

in other languages
 Xavier de Planhol. "De la ville islamique à la métropole iranienne: quelques aspects du développement contemporain de Téhéran," dans Recherches sur la géographie humaine de l'Iran septentrional  (in French) (Paris: 1964).
 Paul Vieille and K. Moheni, "Ecologie culturelle d'une ville islamique: Téhéran," Revue Géographique de l'Est 9:3–4 (1969): 315–359.  (in French)
 Paul Vieille. Marché des terrains et société urbaine. Recherche sur la ville de Tehran  (in French) (Paris: Anthropos, 1970).

External links

  (Bibliography)
 
 
 Map of Tehran, 1947.
 Items related to Tehran, various dates (via Europeana)
 Items related to Tehran, various dates (via Digital Public Library of America)

Timelines of cities in Iran

Iranian timelines
Timelines of capitals
Timeline
Years in Iran
Megacity timelines
Articles containing video clips